Kingdown and Middledown is a 5.7 hectare (14.1 acre) biological Site of Special Scientific Interest near Cheddar in the Mendip Hills, Somerset, notified in 1991.

This site, which is in two parts, is situated on the plateau of the Mendip Hills and supports populations of two nationally rare plant species. Kingdown is at the end of a dry valley where Carboniferous Limestone outcrops as a small cliff, opposite which is a small disused limestone quarry. Covering some of the rock outcrops are clumps of Cheddar Pink (Dianthus gratianopolitanus), which is a nationally rare species. The nationally scarce species Soft-leaved Sedge (Carex montana) and Cheddar Bedstraw (Galium fleurotii) are also found here.

References 

Mendip Hills
Sites of Special Scientific Interest in Somerset
Sites of Special Scientific Interest notified in 1991